Srednetsaritsynsky is a rural locality (a khutor) and the administrative center of Srednetsaritsynskoye Rural Settlement, Serafimovichsky District, Volgograd Oblast, Russia. The population was 644 as of 2010. There are 19 streets.

Geography 
Srednetsaritsynsky is located 35 km southwest of Serafimovich (the district's administrative centre) by road. Karagichev is the nearest rural locality.

References 

Rural localities in Serafimovichsky District